Teresa Medina (born 30 December 1965) is a Spanish cinematographer.
 
She was born in Madrid.

Filmography

References

External links
 

Spanish cinematographers
1965 births
Living people
Spanish women cinematographers